Amchem Noxib is a 1963 Indian Konkani-language film directed by A. Salam and produced by Frank Fernand. It is the second Konkani film, after Mogacho Anvddo, which released in 1950. Amchem Noxib was a trendsetter for the fledgling Konkani cinema.

Cast

 C. Alvares
 Ophelia
 Rita Lobo
 Anthony Mendes
 Antonette Mendes
 M. Boyer
 Kid Boxer
 Souza Ferrao
 Remie Colaco
 Cyriaco Dias
 Star of Arrosim
 Titta Pretto
 Rico Rod
 Seby Coutinho
 Alfred Rose
 Philomena Braz
 Lucian Dias
 Leena Vaz
 Master Vaz

Source:

Music

Amchem Noxib has some of Konkani cinema's most memorable and popular songs. The producer Fernand was himself accomplished in the field of music.

References

External links
 

Indian black-and-white films
1963 films
Films set in Goa
1960s Konkani-language films